Hemibagrus spilopterus is a species of bagrid catfish from Cambodia, is only known from the lower Mekong.

References

Bagridae
Fish of Asia
Fish of Cambodia
Taxa named by Heok Hee Ng
Fish described in 1999